Andor Tyirják (also known as Andrei Țiriac or Andrei Tiriák; born 12 September 1926 – 25 April 1997) was a Romanian professional footballer of Hungarian ethnicity. He grew up in Oradea at Elektromos FC and Nagyváradi AC, then after World War II was an important member of football teams based in Oradea, playing especially for Club Atletic Oradea, but also for teams such as CFR Oradea or Flamura Roșie Oradea. In 1951 he was transferred by Locomotiva București, playing in 4 league matches for "the white and burgundies".

Tyirják was a very respected player of Club Atletic Oradea, captain of the team and winner of the Romanian Cup in 1956, also runner-up in 1955.

Honours
Progresul Oradea
Divizia B: 1955
Cupa României: 1956
Cupa României: Runner-up 1955

References

External links
 Andor Tyirják at labtof.ro

1926 births
1997 deaths
Sportspeople from Oradea
Romanian footballers
Association football defenders
Liga I players
Liga II players
CA Oradea players
CS Târgu Mureș players
Crișana Oradea players
FC Rapid București players